Walter Barnard Hill (September 5, 1851 – December 28, 1905) was chancellor of the University of Georgia (UGA) in Athens from 1899 until his death in 1905 (The head of the university was referred to as chancellor instead of president, from 1860 until 1932).

Biography
Hill was born in Talbotton, Georgia. He obtained three degrees from the university: A.B. (1870), M.A. (1871), and Bachelor of Laws (B.L.) (1871) and was a member of the Chi Phi Fraternity.  He practiced law in Macon, Georgia.

Hill's efforts eventually led to contraction of pneumonia, and he died in office in December 1905. He was buried in the Oconee Hill Cemetery in Athens.

Accomplishments
* Created the foundations for the College of Agriculture and the College of Education
 Expanded the law curriculum from one to two years
 Established a School of Pharmacy (1903)
 Prepared for the School of Forestry (1906)
 Secured $151,000 in funding from the Georgia General Assembly between 1900 and 1905 (as opposed to just $8,000 in 1899)
 Opened the following buildings on the university of Georgia campus: Denmark Hall (1901), Peabody Library (1905); Science Hall/Terrell Hall (1897/1904), Candler Hall (1902), and Meigs (originally, LeConte) Hall (1905).

References

Further reading
History of the University of Georgia by Thomas Walter Reed; Frontmatter and Chapter I: The Beginnings of the University, Thomas Walter Reed,  Imprint:  Athens, Georgia : University of Georgia, ca. 1949
From Ahmedunggar to Lavonia Presidents at the University of Georgia 1785-1997, University of Georgia Libraries, Hargrett Rare Book and Manuscript Library

1851 births
1905 deaths
Presidents of the University of Georgia
University of Georgia alumni
Deaths from pneumonia in Georgia (U.S. state)
People from Talbotton, Georgia